Harald G. Petersson (16 October 1904 – 8 July 1977) was a German screenwriter. He wrote for 36 films between 1934 and 1967. He was born in Weimar, Germany and died in Berlin, Germany.

Selected filmography

 The Coral Princess (1937)
The Secret Lie (1938)
 The Night of Decision (1938)
 Red Orchids (1938)
 Woman Without a Past (1939)
 A Man Astray (1940)
 Anna Alt (1945)
 Raid (1947)
 An Everyday Story (1948)
 Nora's Ark (1948)
 The Last Night (1949)
 Crime After School (1959)
 The Door with Seven Locks (1962)
 The Inn on the River (1962)
 Axel Munthe, The Doctor of San Michele (1962)
 The Squeaker (1963)
 The Indian Scarf (1963)
 Apache Gold (1963)
 Der Hexer (1964)
 Last of the Renegades (1964)
 Winnetou and Old Firehand (1966)
 Creature with the Blue Hand (1967)

References

External links

1904 births
1977 deaths
Writers from Weimar
Film people from Thuringia
20th-century German screenwriters
German male screenwriters